This is a list of episodes of Through The Dragon's Eye (a ten-part BBC Look and Read educational children's fantasy television programme). Each episode was about 20 minutes long. During the opening credits of "Through the Dragon's Eye" a book with the same title opened at a specific "Chapter" (for example, Chapter 1: The Dragon from Pelamar).

Chapter 1: The Dragon from Pelamar

Three children (Jenny, Scott and Amanda) pass through a mural they have been painting and find themselves in the magical land of Pelamar. There, Gorwen the dragon tells them that the "life source" of Pelamar, the Veetacore has exploded. He then asks for their help to re-build it. They then travel to the Veetacore House and meet the Veetacore Keepers, Boris, Morris and Doris. The episode ends with Amanda finding out that three Veetons are missing.The Dragon From Pelamar was aired in the UK on 19 September 1989.

Chapter 2: Flight to Widge

Gorwen the Dragon believes that the missing Veetons must have fallen beyond the mountains of Pelamar into the strange land of Widge. Amanda, Scott, Boris, Rodey and Gorwen set off to find the lost Veetons and the quest begins. Jenny stays behind with the other two Veetacore Keepers, Doris and Morris to help them read a book on how to put the Veetacore back together again.

Boris and Amanda crash land into a "high fade zone" of Widge and have to leave quickly because Rodey (a giant talking mouse) shrinks. When the air gets too thin for Boris and Gorwen to fly through the search party land at Border Camp in Widge. The Widgets (the native inhabitants of Widge – small squirrel-like animals) let them stay for the night. In the morning, they help Scott and Rodey as to which road they should take (Rodey could speak "Widgen" – the language of Widge).

Chapter 3: The First Veeton

With the Widgets as their guides, the search party set off through the Woods of Widge. Jenny tries to contact Gorwen on a videophone to ask whether Boris took a "veetarod" with him (a long, thin instrument the Keepers use to locate Veetons with). Scott starts to suspect that the Widgets are not all that they seem, when Boris falls into a quagmire, which could have been avoided if Boris could have read the sign saying "Danger! Quagmire!". Rodey the mouse goes off in a huff, and the others leave him to catch up with them. The veetarod (which Boris had taken with him) works and leads the party to a huge tree (unfortunately the door into the tree is locked).

Chapter 4: Word Magic

The Widgets have hidden the first Veeton inside a huge book tree. Boris and Amanda manage to unlock it and enter it in search of the Veeton, while Scott and the dragon Gorwen search for Rodey, who is still missing. Boris and Amanda follow some signs to the library. Inside Boris solves a clue, and finds the first Veeton. The kindly Book Tree lets Boris take some books with him for when he can read. They find the way out and try contacting Doris with the news, however Doris never replies. The credits roll up on Doris with a huge look of shock and absolute terror on her face.Word Magic was aired on 10 October 1989

Chapter 5: Clues in the Snow

With the help of the veetarod, Scott and Gorwen find Boris, Amanda and the first Veeton in a gravel pit (the exit of the Book Tree). Then it starts to snow. Scott finds a "snowflake clue", which tells them to go to Ash Rock. They set out through the snow, however almost as soon as they set off, the Widgets corner them and engage them in a snowball fight. After the fight, which everyone enjoys, Scott, Boris and Gorwen find that the Widgets have taken the Veeton and Boris' rucksack, and that they have kidnapped Amanda. Gorwen sets off to find them, while Boris and Scott continue to Ash Rock.

Meanwhile, at the Veetacore House, we find out why Doris is not replying to Boris' message. Charn, the Evil One, an exiled Pelamot, has returned to try to take over Pelamar. Boris can only see the back of Doris' head in his videophone, and therefore thinks Doris is simply being rude when she cuts him off.  At the Veetacore House, Charn reveals his plan. When the Veetacore is mended, he will chant a spell, which must be chanted as the last Veeton is fitted, with malevolent words rather than the kind and hopeful ones at the back of the book. Jenny at first stands up to Charn, refusing to mend the Veetacore for his purposes, but he scares her into obedience by melting Frug, Morris' pet caterpillar, with his magic hands; if he points at something and keeps his hand on it, a jet of green light shoots out of his hand and melts the object he is pointing at.  He threatens to melt Morris as well, but Jenny decides it would be safer to help him after all. Doris tries to contact Boris as discreetly as possible, but Charn sees her at the last minute, and melts her.Clues in the Snow was aired on 24 October 1989

Chapter 6: Jenny's Scarf

Amanda chases the Widget who stole Boris' rucksack (with the Veeton in it). She rescues it and in doing so, finds Rodey, but they find themselves lost in the snow. Boris and Scott find another clue at Ash Rock. They leave a sign for Amanda and Gorwen to follow. The veetarod then leads them up to the top of a mountain. When they are about halfway up, some rocks hit Boris on the head. One of the rocks is not a rock at all, it is a Veeton. Gorwen catches up with Amanda and Rodey and they continue up to the top of the mountain, where they treat Boris' head and contact Jenny again.

At the Veetacore House, Jenny persuades Charn to let Morris knit her a scarf. She continues to read the book for Charn, who cannot read, and re-builds the Veetacore. When the search party contact Jenny, she holds up Morris' scarf. On the scarf are the words "HELP! CHARN!" Gorwen decides to return to Pelamar alone, with the two Veetons. He leaves Rodey, Amanda, Boris and Scott to find the last Veeton by themselves.Jenny's Scarf was aired on 31 October 1989

Chapter 7: The Waterfall of Words

"No-one can face Charn and live. Only Gorwen has a chance... " 

During the night, the search party pitch a tent and spend the night at the top of the mountains. During the night, two troublesome Widgets sneak into the tent and steal Boris' map of Widge. They rip the map up, leaving Boris, Amanda, Scott and Rodey alone with no "map, no time and no words to help" them. Suddenly, a waterfall of words appears gushing down the mountainside, giving them a clue as what to do next.

Meanwhile, Gorwen makes his way back through Widge by night. He appears outside the Veetacore House, where he is seen by Jenny and Charn. Morris goes out the back door of the house to try and tell Gorwen.The Waterfalls of Words was aired on 7 November 1989

Chapter 8: The Great Battle

Gorwen returns to the Veetacore House, where Charn is waiting for him. Morris tries to warn him, but is zapped by Charn. There is a great battle and Charn is eventually beaten forever; Charn had already been beaten once by Gorwen and as a result was banished from Pelamar.

After the battle, Gorwen knows he still has time to save Morris, Doris, Frug and the rest of Morris' pets that Charn had melted, even though he, himself is becoming weaker and weaker. Doris then sends a message to Scott, Rodey, Amanda and Boris: Charn beaten but Gorwen fading. Hurry! Then Rodey finds a tunnel through the mountains.The Great Battle was aired on 14 November 1989

Chapter 9: Danger on High

Rodey rescues the veetarod, which had fallen down a deep chasm in the tunnel. The veetarod leads them up to the top of the mountain. Then Boris realises that the Widgets had taken his bat. Amanda persuades Boris to swap some of the books that the Book Tree had given him for the bat. The Widgets agree.

At the Veetacore House, the Veetacore is still unfinished. Frug meanwhile has become a very large cocoon and Gorwen has faded so much he is almost invisible. Jenny tries contacting Boris to tell him to hurry up. Scott and Amanda spot the last Veeton balanced on a tree that has fallen over, wedged between two cliffs.Danger on High was aired on 21 November 1989

Chapter 10: The Final Page

Scott, with the help of the Widgets, manages to rescue the last Veeton. Boris, Amanda and Scott then start the long trek down to the bottom of the mountain after thanking and waving to the Widgets who make a banner for them out of a picnic cloth, which says "Goodbye! Good Luck!"'''.

Meanwhile, Doris and Morris fit the penultimate piece of the Veetacore and wait for the others to return with the last Veeton.

Boris, Amanda and Scott continue through the Woods of Widge until they reach Border Camp. Boris pulls out his magical flying bat and flies home to Pelamar with Scott and Amanda clasping onto the bat with him.

At the Veetacore House, Doris, Morris and Jenny gather round a cracked wall and measure the distance. They are convinced that it is getting bigger. A short while later, after Boris is shown encouraging his bat to go faster, Jenny measures the crack again, while Doris and Morris are asleep with Frug. Gorwen has almost vanished now; he is so pale.

The search party crash-land in Pelamar, miles away from the Veetacore House. To get to the house, Boris makes his cricket bat into a skateboard. They burst into the Veetacore House, on top of Doris, who had just declared that she did not believe that they were coming. They take out the Veeton and look for which way up it is supposed to go. Jenny looks in the book, which tells the Keepers how to fix the Veetacore, however she finds that Frug had eaten the last page.

Just then Frug erupts from his cocoon, revealing the last four words of the missing sentence in the book on each of his four wings. The Veetacore Keepers and the children work out what the sentence is and the last Veeton is placed, by Morris, Doris and Boris, into the Veetacore, while chanting the spell. The Veetacore glows and hums causing Gorwen to come back, Rodey to return to his normal size and the rest of Pelamar to fill with life again.

With their mission complete, the children return to their own world – only a short time after they left it. They all find a miniature veeton in their pockets as a gift from Pelamar – proving their adventure really did happen. The Final Page was aired in the UK on 28 November 1989

See also
  Through The Dragon's Eye  Look and Read''

Lists of British children's television series episodes
Look and Read
List